Martha Amanda Field (born August 20, 1943) is the Langdell Professor of Law at Harvard Law School. She is a noted scholar of constitutional law, family law, and issues bioethics such as the rights of the mentally challenged.

Biography
Field is a graduate of the Winsor School.  She earned her B.A. from Radcliffe, the former women's college of Harvard University, in Chinese history. She later earned a J.D. from the University of Chicago Law School in 1968, graduating at the top of her class. Field then clerked for Supreme Court Justice Abe Fortas. During her time at the Supreme Court she also clerked for Chief Justice Earl Warren and Chief Justice Warren Burger. Field is one of the most sought after voices in the country for her expertise on issues regarding the Eleventh Amendment to the United States Constitution.

She is among the first women to clerk for the U.S. Supreme Court, to teach at University of Pennsylvania Law School, and to teach at Harvard Law School, respectively. In 2011, The Harvard Crimson stated that Field "has had the longest career at Harvard of all the tenured women currently teaching."

Field is married to Senior U.S. Circuit Judge Michael Boudin of the United States Court of Appeals for the First Circuit.

See also 
 List of law clerks of the Supreme Court of the United States (Seat 2)

References

External links
Profile at Harvard Law School website

1943 births
Living people
University of Chicago Law School alumni
Law clerks of the Supreme Court of the United States
Harvard Law School faculty
Radcliffe College alumni
American women lawyers
American women legal scholars
American legal scholars
Winsor School alumni
University of Pennsylvania Law School faculty
American women academics
21st-century American women